Mahmeleh Rural District is a rural district (dehestan) in Mahmeleh District, Khonj County, Fars Province, Iran. At the 2006 census, its population was 3,925, in 817 families.  The rural district has 10 villages.

References 

Rural Districts of Fars Province
Khonj County